Ricardo Mariano Dabrowski (born 28 March 1961 in Lomas de Zamora, Argentina) is an Argentine former football player and manager. He played as a forward for clubs of Argentina, Chile and Mexico.

Career
A native of Temperley, Dabrowski (also known as Ruso) played football with his hometown's Club Atlético Temperley before spending most of his playing career in Chilean football.  In 2010, he re-joined Temperley as the club's manager.

Teams (player)
  Temperley 1978–1982
  Huracán 1983
  Toluca 1984–1985
  Platense 1985
  Temperley 1986–1987
  Colo-Colo 1987–1992

Teams (coach)
  Colo-Colo (assistant) 1992
  Magallanes 1993
  Palestino 1993
  Colo-Colo (assistant) 1994
  Newell's Old Boys (assistant) 1998
  Newell's Old Boys (interim) 1998
  Palestino 1998–2000
  Santiago Wanderers 2002
  Aldosivi 2004
  Colo-Colo 2004
  Colo-Colo 2005 
  Deportes Melipilla 2008
  Tiro Federal 2009
  Temperley 2010–2011
  Sol de América 2011–2013
  3 de Febrero 2014
  Nacional 2015–2016

Titles
 Colo-Colo 1989, 1990 and 1991 Primera División de Chile and 1991 Copa Libertadores

References

External links
 
 
 Ricardo Dabrowski at MemoriaWanderers.cl 

1961 births
Living people
People from Lomas de Zamora
Argentine people of Polish descent
Sportspeople from Buenos Aires Province
Argentine footballers
Argentine expatriate footballers
Primera B Metropolitana players
Argentine Primera División players
Club Atlético Temperley footballers
Club Atlético Huracán footballers
Club Atlético Platense footballers
Liga MX players
Deportivo Toluca F.C. players
Chilean Primera División players
Colo-Colo footballers
Argentine expatriate sportspeople in Mexico
Expatriate footballers in Mexico
Argentine expatriate sportspeople in Chile
Expatriate footballers in Chile
Association football forwards
Argentine football managers
Argentine expatriate football managers
Magallanes managers
Club Deportivo Palestino managers
Newell's Old Boys managers
Santiago Wanderers managers
Aldosivi managers
Colo-Colo managers
Deportes Melipilla managers
Tiro Federal managers
Club Sol de América managers
Club Nacional managers
Primera B de Chile managers
Chilean Primera División managers
Argentine Primera División managers
Paraguayan Primera División managers
Expatriate football managers in Chile
Argentine expatriate sportspeople in Paraguay
Expatriate football managers in Paraguay
Naturalized citizens of Chile